Soter derives from the Greek epithet  (sōtēr), meaning a saviour, a deliverer; initial capitalised ; fully capitalised ; feminine Soteira (Σώτειρα) or sometimes Soteria (Σωτηρία).

"Soter" was used as: 
 a title of gods: Poseidon Soter, Zeus Soter, Dionysus Soter, Apollo Soter, Hades Soter, Helios Soter, Athena Soteira, Asclepius Soter, and Hecate Soteira. 
 the name of a distinct mythical figure, Soter (daimon)
 an epithet of several heroized or deified leaders of Hellenistic dynasties, see Hellenistic ruler cult:
Antigonus Monophthalmus (382 to 301 BCE), awarded the title for liberating Athens from Cassander
Ptolemy I Soter of Egypt (reigned 323-283 BCE)
Antiochus I Soter of the Seleucid Empire (reigned 281-261 BCE)
Demetrius I Soter of the Seleucid Empire (reigned 161-150 BCE)
Diomedes Soter
Dionysios Soter
Polyxenos Epiphanes Soter
Rabbel II Soter
Attalus I
Seleucus III Ceraunus
Ptolemy IX (died 81 BCE), twice king of Ptolemaic Egypt
Diodotus I
Strato II
Strato I
Menander I (died 130 BCE), Greco-Bactrian and Indo-Greek king
 a title of liberators (see also eleutherios (disambiguation)
a title of Jesus of Nazareth, which came into use some time after the death of Paul the Apostle, most particularly in the fish acronym
the term "God our Saviour" (dative) occurs several times in the New Testament, in the Epistle of Jude, 1 Timothy and Titus.
Pope Soter, .

See also
Hellenistic religion
Soteria (disambiguation)
Soteriology, the study of salvation; in Christian contexts, the branch of Christology dealing with Jesus' capacity as Saviour of humankind
Sozusa (disambiguation)

References

Ancient Greek titles
Soter
Epithets of Poseidon
Epithets of Zeus
Epithets of Asclepius
New Testament Greek words and phrases
Epithets of Helios